Eben Botha (born 26 April 1999) is a South African cricketer. He made his List A debut on 17 November 2019, for North West in the 2019–20 CSA Provincial One-Day Challenge. He made his first-class debut on 21 November 2019, for North West in the 2019–20 CSA 3-Day Provincial Cup. In April 2021, he was named in North West's squad, ahead of the 2021–22 cricket season in South Africa. He made his Twenty20 debut on 8 October 2021, for North West in the 2021–22 CSA Provincial T20 Knock-Out tournament.

He played for Coggeshall Town Cricket Club, Essex during the 2022 season scoring 1100 runs for the club, In the 2022-23 season, he played in Australia for New City Cricket Club scoring 41 on debut.

References

External links
 

1999 births
Living people
South African cricketers
North West cricketers
Place of birth missing (living people)